Amata nigricilia is a moth of the family Erebidae. It was described by Strand in 1912. It is found in Tanzania.

References

 Natural History Museum Lepidoptera generic names catalog

Endemic fauna of Tanzania
nigricilia
Moths described in 1912
Moths of Africa